Konkin may refer to:

Konkin Foulgo, village in the Zimtenga Department of Bam Province in northern-central Burkina Faso
Konkin Moogo, village in the Zimtenga Department of Bam Province in northern-central Burkina Faso
Konkin (surname)

See also
John Conkin and Clara Layton Harlin House, a historic home in Missouri, USA
Koankin
Konk (disambiguation)